The National Firefighter Registry (NFR) is a voluntary registry of firefighters in the United States used to collect relevant occupational, lifestyle, and health information on firefighters for evaluating cancer rates and cancer risk factors in the U.S. fire service. It aims to use this data to reduce cancer in firefighters. The NFR was created by the Firefighter Cancer Registry Act of 2018 in response to growing evidence of carcinogenic exposures and increased risk for cancer faced by firefighters. It is expected to begin registering firefighters in 2022. The NFR is maintained by the U.S. National Institute for Occupational Safety and Health (NIOSH).

Cancer among firefighters 

 
Cancer risk in the U.S. fire service is a topic of growing concern. Recent studies suggest that exposure on the fireground may increase risk to firefighters of certain types of cancer and other chronic diseases.  Major international studies generally support findings from U.S. studies that firefighters experience increased rates of cancer, with some variation by cancer site.

Firefighters regularly encounter carcinogenic materials and hazardous contaminants, which is thought to contribute to their excess cancer risk. Dozens of chemicals classified by the International Agency for Research on Cancer (IARC) as known or probable carcinogens  have been identified on the fireground. Several studies have documented airborne and/or dermal exposures to carcinogenic compounds during firefighting, as well as contamination on turnout gear and other equipment worn by firefighters.  Some of these compounds have been shown to absorb into firefighters’ bodies.

In addition to chemical exposures, firefighters also often work 24-hour or longer shifts; they also respond to emergencies and work shifts at night. Night shift work has been classified by IARC as a probable human carcinogen factor. Some firefighters also work with hazardous materials and are trained to control and clean up dangerous materials such as oil spills and chemical accidents. As firefighters combat a fire and clean up hazardous materials, they risk harmful chemicals contacting their skin or penetrating their personal protective equipment (PPE). In June 2022, IARC classified occupational exposure as a firefighter as “carcinogenic to humans.”

There are many types of firefighters. Most research on firefighters’ cancer risk has involved structural or municipal career firefighters. Wildland firefighters are specially trained firefighters tasked with controlling forest fires. They frequently create fire lines, which are swathes of cut-down trees and dug-up grass placed in the path of the fire. This is designed to deprive the fire of fuel. Wildland firefighting is a physically demanding job with many acute hazards. Wildland firefighters may hike several miles while carrying heavy equipment during the wildfire season, which has increased in duration over time, especially in the western United States. Unlike structural firefighters, wildland firefighters typically do not wear respiratory protection, and may inhale particulate and other compounds emitted by the wildfires. They also use prescribed fires to burn potential fire fuel under controlled conditions. To examine cancer risk for wildland firefighters, a risk assessment was conducted using an exposure-response relationship for risk of lung cancer mortality and measured particulate matter exposure from smoke at wildfires. This study concluded that wildland firefighters could have an increased risk of lung cancer mortality. When not on the scene of an emergency, firefighters remain on call at fire stations, where they eat, sleep, and perform other duties during their shifts. Hence, sleep disruption is another occupational hazard that they may encounter at their job.

The research on cancer for other subspecialty groups of firefighters is limited, but a recent study of fire instructors in Australia found an exposure-response relationship between training exposures and cancer incidence.

In addition to epidemiological studies, mechanistic studies have used biomarkers to investigate exposures' effects on biological changes that could be related to cancer development. Several of these studies have found evidence of DNA damage, oxidative stress, and epigenetic changes related to firefighters' exposures.

History

Background 
Due to the lack of central and comprehensive sources of data, research on cancer rates amongst firefighters has been challenging. Although some evidence suggests the risk for specific cancer types could vary for male, female, and non-white firefighters, the strength of the evidence related to cancer in demographic subgroups is limited because many previous studies have mainly comprised white male samples of firefighters. Larger samples of female firefighters and minority groups are needed before the conclusions can be drawn about cancer risk across the nation’s diverse fire service.

Additionally, while state cancer registries provide rich data for studying cancer in the U.S., state cancer registries often do not provide comprehensive information on cancer patients’ work history and workplace practices, making it challenging to use this data source alone for studying cancer in firefighters. It is also important to collect information on personal and lifestyle risk factors (e.g. tobacco and alcohol use, sleep deprivation, diet, and physical activity) in the U.S. fire service to better understand how they may affect the relationship between firefighting and cancer.

Creation and implementation 

The Firefighter Cancer Registry Act of 2018 bill was introduced in the U.S. House of Representatives on February 7, 2017, by Robert Menendez. It required the Centers for Disease Control and Prevention to create a registry designed to collect data on cancer rates among U.S. firefighters. The bill was passed with unanimous and bipartisan approval. On July 7, 2018, Congress passed the bill, mandating CDC to create a National Firefighter Registry (NFR). The Congressional Budget Office estimated that the bill would cost around 10 million dollars. However, the Republican Policy Committee states that the cost of the bill would be offset by a reduction in the funding of the CDC.

NIOSH, part of the CDC, has been given authority to lead this effort (beginning in fiscal year 2019) with input from the scientific and firefighting communities. The NFR program receives input and guidance from the NFR Subcommittee, a subcommittee of the NIOSH Board of Scientific Counselors (a Federal Advisory Committee), consisting of 12 rotating subject matter experts in firefighting, epidemiology, medicine, or public health. The CDC and NIOSH expect the NFR to be open for enrollment in the Fall of 2022.

Operation 

The proposed approach for the NFR states it will be a "surveillance system" of U.S. firefighters over the age of 18 years. The main goal of the NFR, according to the text of the law, is "to develop and maintain…a voluntary registry of firefighters to collect relevant health and occupational information of such firefighters for purposes of determining cancer incidence." According to the Republican Policy Committee's summary, the NFR aims to provide decision makers with data to help them create new protocols to protect firefighters. It aims to register around 200,000 firefighters across a variety of demographics within 5 years. NIOSH plans to recruit firefighters through various communication channels (e.g., NFR website and newsletter, social media, local/state/national unions, affinity groups, trade journals, conference attendees) or directly from selected rosters of firefighters.

Participation in the NFR is entirely voluntary and is open to all firefighters, including retired ones. Firefighters who register will provide their name, date of birth, and information about their lifestyle and exposures. Following this participants may be given voluntary yearly questionnaires. NIOSH can then use this information to track past and future diagnoses of cancer among NFR participants by matching with data from state cancer registries to understand how firefighters’ work impacts their risk of developing cancer.

Cancer is a nationally notifiable condition, and thus all U.S. states track diagnoses of cancer in a state cancer registry. The NFR is planned to also seek additional details about participant’s types of emergency responses attended and exposures by working with fire departments and exposure tracking programs (if applicable), and by administering follow-up questionnaires to registered firefighters. Because cancer has a long latency period – which is the time between exposure to carcinogens and the development of cancer – the NFR will monitor cancer outcomes for decades.

Firefighter enrollment 
According to NIOSH's website all members will enroll through a web portal. Their website also states that any information gathered through the program will only be accessible to NIOSH researchers and will be protected with multi-factor authentication and "multiple layers of encryption." Firefighters may access the web portal through the dedicated NFR website (https://www.cdc.gov/niosh/firefighters/registry.html or https://www.cdc.gov/NFR) or by directly accessing the web portal when it launches. To complete enrollment in the NFR, participants will need to set up an account, complete an informed consent document, user profile, and enrollment questionnaire.

The  user profile will serve to collect basic information from the firefighter that could change over time and hence can be accessed and updated by the user. The enrollment questionnaire will collect information on employment/workplace characteristics, exposure, demographics, lifestyle factors, comorbidities, and other confounders. The enrollment process, including the questionnaire, is designed to take 30–45 minutes to complete. Following enrollment, NIOSH will send NFR participants notifications for periodic follow-up questionnaires (e.g., one per year) to be filled out through the web portal.

Other sources of information 
In addition to roster information, NIOSH plans to request fire incident records dating back to January 1, 2010, or earlier when available, from fire departments for some participants. Fire departments are required to collect some basic information about fire incidents under the National Fire Incident Reporting System (NFIRS) established by the U.S. Fire Administration. Department incident records will provide NIOSH investigators with apparatus and incident-specific information to be used as surrogates of exposure for exposure-response analyzes. Specific variables of interest requested from department incident records may include: incident number, fire station, apparatus, incident type (structure fire, car fire, etc.), on scene time, off scene time, job assignments, number of fire runs, and duration at fires. NIOSH will explore obtaining records directly through states, NFIRS, and/or software vendors to reduce the burden on each participating fire department.

References 

Occupational cancer
Cancer organizations
Firefighting in the United States
National Institute for Occupational Safety and Health